The Transportation Law Journal is a biannual law review covering the field of transportation law. It covers domestic as well as international developments of legal, regulatory, economic, and political interest in all modes of transportation - pipelines, freight forwarders, brokers, and air, motor, rail, and water carriage. The journal is published by the University of Denver Sturm College of Law and was established in 1969.

External links 
 

American law journals
University of Denver
Triannual journals
Publications established in 1969
English-language journals
Transportation journals